Mount Edgcumbe may refer to:

 Places
 Mount Edgcumbe Country Park, in Cornwall, United Kingdom
 Mount Edgcumbe House, located within Mount Edgcumbe Country Park
 Mount Edgecombe, KwaZulu-Natal, a sugar-growing town in KwaZulu-Natal, South Africa

 People
Earl of Mount Edgcumbe, a title in the peerage of the United Kingdom:
 George Edgcumbe, 1st Earl of Mount Edgcumbe (1720–95), British peer, naval officer and politician
 Richard Edgcumbe, 2nd Earl of Mount Edgcumbe (1764–1839), British politician and writer on music
 Ernest Edgcumbe, 3rd Earl of Mount Edgcumbe (1797–1861), British peer and politician
 William Edgcumbe, 4th Earl of Mount Edgcumbe (1833–1917), British courtier and Conservative politician
 Piers Edgcumbe, 5th Earl of Mount Edgcumbe (1865–1944), British soldier

 Other
 HMS Mount Edgcumbe, Royal Navy ship, previously commissioned as the training establishment HMS Conway, originally built in 1822 as HMS Winchester